At 13:45 on 1 December 2020, a man rammed pedestrians with an SUV at high speed in a pedestrian zone in Trier, Rhineland-Palatinate, Germany, killing six people—a 45-year-old man and his infant daughter; a 77-year-old man; and three women aged 25, 52, and 73— and wounding 23 others. The driver, who was alone in the car and had a blood alcohol content of 0.14%, was arrested at the scene.

The driver was identified as a 51-year-old local homeless man of German nationality. He was born in Trier and at the time of the attack lived in the car. Police do not think that he acted for political, religious or ideological motives, but for mental health problems mixed with the alcohol abuse. Investigators said that he wanted to kill and injure as many people as possible.

See also
Graz car attack
January 2017 Melbourne car attack
December 2017 Melbourne car attack
2017 Times Square car attack
2018 Brăila attack
Volkmarsen ramming attack

References 

2020 murders in Germany
2020 road incidents in Europe
21st century in Rhineland-Palatinate
Crime in Rhineland-Palatinate
December 2020 crimes in Europe
December 2020 events in Germany
History of Trier
Vehicular rampage in Germany